The Baker Wildcats football team represents Baker University in the sport of college football. They participate in the NAIA and in the Heart of America Athletic Conference (HAAC).

References